Rabbi Dr. Hosea Jacobi (born Hosea Hermannn Jacoby; 1841–1925) was Chief Rabbi of Zagreb, Croatia for 58 years and the spiritual and religious leader of the Jewish community in Croatia.

Biography
Jacobi was born in Jacobshagen, Kingdom of Prussia (now Poland), the son of the merchant Mayer Jacobi and his wife Sara-Miriam (née Goldberg). His father died when he was ten years old, and his maternal grandfather Rabbi Jacob Moses Goldberg and uncle Rabbi Nachman Abraham Goldberg were his religious instructors.

He attended the Kölnische Gymnasium school in Berlin. A member of the Modern Orthodox Jewish congregation in Berlin, Jacobi was a student of Rabbi Azriel Hildesheimer and Rabbi Elchanan Rosenstein who ordained him.
He studied Semitic languages, Hebrew and Theology, in the universities of Berlin and Halle, Saxony-Anhalt (Ph.D. 1865, his dissertation being "De loco feminarum apud Iudaeos antiuissimos maxime matrimonii contrahendi ratione habita" – "The Role of Women in Judaism"). Jacobi married Hulda Pander and had seven children.

In 1867 he became Chief Rabbi of Zagreb, Croatia. Jacobi established and headed, in Zagreb, the Jewish elementary school (Talmud Torah), taught Jewish Studies in high-schools, taught Hebrew and Judaism and established Jewish-Women organizations. He was also active in social welfare projects for the Jewish and General Population in Yugoslavia, for which he was highly respected by the general population and the leaders of other religious denominations. In 1885 Jacobi delivered the first Synagogue-Sermon in the Croat language thus encouraging the integration of Jews into the general population; he also wrote the first ever Jewish-Studies text-books in Croatian.

Jacobi's children: his son Dr. Ivan (Hans, Johanan), his daughters Luise Zaloscer and Klara (Loja) Barmaper and his son-in-law Dr. Hugo Spitzer were among the prominent leaders of the Jewish community and Zionist Movement in Croatia.

Jacobi died in Zagreb and was buried at the Mirogoj Cemetery.

Writings
 Ueber die Stellung des Weibes im Judenthum. Vienna, 1865.
 Worauf haben wir bei der Erziehung unserer Kinder zu achten? (Predigt). Zagreb, 1872.
 Was ist der Talmud? und was hat er für Israel gethan? Zagreb, 1880.
 Dereh Hakodeš, Put Svjetlosti (Derech Hakodesch). Zagreb, 1900.
 Biblijska Povjesnica za izraelsku mladež pučkih i nižih srednjih škola. Zagreb, 1923.

References

Bibliography

See also

 History of the Jews in Croatia
 Modern Orthodox Judaism
 Azriel Hildesheimer
 Torah im Derech Eretz

1841 births
1925 deaths
People from Stargard County
Burials at Mirogoj Cemetery
Croatian people of German-Jewish descent
Croatian people of Polish-Jewish descent
Austro-Hungarian rabbis
Chief rabbis of Croatia
Modern Orthodox rabbis
German Orthodox rabbis
People from the Province of Pomerania
Yugoslav rabbis
Croatian Orthodox rabbis